Katogo (also known as Katoro) is a town in the far north of Ivory Coast. It is a sub-prefecture of M'Bengué Department in Poro Region, Savanes District. Seven kilometres north of town is a border crossing with Mali.

Kotogo was a commune until March 2012, when it became one of 1126 communes nationwide that were abolished.

In 2014, the population of the sub-prefecture of Katogo was 14,862.

Villages
The 14 villages of the sub-prefecture of Katogo and their population in 2014 are:

Notes

Sub-prefectures of Poro Region
Former communes of Ivory Coast